The Way Home is the debut studio album by American contemporary worship duo The McClures. Bethel Music released the album on August 30, 2019. The album contains guest appearances by Rita Springer and David Leonard. The album was produced by David Leonard.

The album was supported by the release of "Now I See", "Only Have One", and "Reign Above It All" as singles. The album debuted at number 36 on the US Top Christian Albums chart.

Background
The McClures initially announced that they would be released their debut studio album, The Way Home, at the 2019 WorshipU conference hosted by Bethel Music. The album began the songwriting process for the album at a Nashville retreat in December 2016, as the duo enlisted songwriters like Joel Taylor, Rita Springer, Seth Mosley, Matt Hammitt, Mia Fieldes and Ethan Hulse among others. The album was recorded at the Layman Drug Company in Nashville, Tennessee.

The title of the album, The Way Home comes from the title track, which the duo had originally written with Josh Baldwin for his album. Paul McClure said "He [Josh Baldwin] played it a lot, and every time he played it, he said to us, "It feels like your song." It was a last-minute addition and we didn’t even think of it being the title track until we were in Nashville. It's the theme of our season because we are returning home and remembering who we are and these songs are a reflection of that. We recorded that song first and it set the direction for the rest of the songs."

Music and lyrics
Paul McClure described the album as a blend of "worship, country, indie, Americana, and folk," reflecting the duo's North Carolinian roots.

Release and promotion
The McClures made announced their career debut on Bethel Music with the release of "Now I See" on July 12, 2019, as the lead single from The Way Home. "Now I See" was impacted Christian radio in the United States on August 9, 2019.

On August 16, 2019, The McClures released "Only Have One" as the second single from The Way Home. "Only Have One" debuted at number 49 on the Billboard Hot Christian Songs Chart dated September 10, 2019.

On February 12, 2021, the duo released "Reign Above It All" as their third single from the album.

Critical reception
In a positive review from NewReleaseToday, Mark Ryan states, "The Way Home is less a typical corporate worship album and more of a personal time of prayer and reflection album and it is in these personal times where we can stop and hear the voice of God as he gently whispers to us to give us the direction we need in our lives." Gateway News' Luchae Williams gave a positive review of the album, saying "Through this album, the McClures have found a way to share their testimony of a God who is in it for the long haul and always eager to help you discover the way home."

Commercial performance
In the United States, The Way Home debuted at number 36 on the Billboard Top Christian Albums chart dated September 14, 2019.
The album also launched at number 31 on the Independent Albums chart, and number 11 on the Heatseekers Albums chart.

Track listing

 Songwriting credits adapted from PraiseCharts.

Charts

Release history

References

External links
 

2019 debut albums